Blueback may refer to any of a number of unrelated fish species with blue coloration:
Blueback (novel), a 1997 novel by Australian author Tim Winton
USS Blueback (SS-326), a US Navy submarine of the Balao-class
USS Blueback (SS-581), a Barbel-class submarine and the last non-nuclear submarine to join the US Naval Fleet
Beardslee trout or bluebacks
Blueback, a juvenile hooded seal
Blueback (film), an Australian drama

See also
 Blueback herring or blueback shad
 Blueback salmon or sockeye salmon